State Road 131 (NM 131) is a  state highway in the US state of New Mexico. NM 131's southern terminus is at the end of state maintenance near Manzano Mountains State Park entrance, and the northern terminus is at NM 55 in Manzano.

Major intersections

See also

References

131
Transportation in Torrance County, New Mexico